The 1923 LFF Lyga was the 2nd season of the LFF Lyga football competition in Lithuania.  It was contested by 4 teams, and LFLS Kaunas won the championship.

League standings

References
RSSSF

LFF Lyga seasons
Lith
Lith
1923 in Lithuanian football